The Textile Workers' Union is the name of:

Amalgamated Textile Workers' Union, in Great Britain
Coimbatore District Textile Workers Union, in India
Danish Textile Workers' Union
Northern Ireland Textile Workers' Union
Portadown Textile Workers' Union, in Northern Ireland
Scottish Textile Workers' Union
Textile Workers' Union (Finland)
Textile Workers Union of America